Room 304 is a 2011 Danish drama film directed by Birgitte Stærmose.

Cast
 Mikael Birkkjær as Kasper
 Stine Stengade as Nina
 David Dencik as Martin
 Luan Jaha as Agim
 Ariadna Gil as Teresa
 Lourdes Faberes as Maid
 Ksenija Marinković as Elira
 Trine Dyrholm as Helene
 Magnus Krepper as Jonas
 Ivo Gregurević as Nebojsa

References

External links
 

2011 films
2011 drama films
2010s Danish-language films
Films set in hotels
Danish drama films
Films scored by Jocelyn Pook